Alfred Du Cros (10 December 1868 –  21 December 1946) was a British politician. He was a Conservative Member of Parliament (MP) in 1910.

Du Cros was elected to the Commons in the January 1910 general election, succeeding the Liberal MP Stopford Brooke in the Bow and Bromley constituency. The January election had produced a hung parliament, and another general election was called in December 1910. Alfred du Cros retired at this election, and his seat was won by the Labour candidate George Lansbury.

Footnotes

References

External links 
 

1868 births
1946 deaths
Conservative Party (UK) MPs for English constituencies
UK MPs 1910